Limnactiniidae is a family of sea anemones belonging to the order Actiniaria.

Genera:
 Limnactinia Carlgren, 1921

References

Actinioidea
Cnidarian families